Lower Ed: The Troubling Rise of For-Profit Colleges in the New Economy is a 2017 book about American for-profit colleges by sociologist Tressie McMillan Cottom.

References

External links 

 
 Author's website

2017 non-fiction books
English-language books
The New Press books
Sociology books
Books about higher education